Victoria Elizabeth Crowe OBE, DHC, FRSE, MA (RCA) RSA, RSW (born 1945) is a Scottish artist known for her portrait and landscape paintings. She has works in several collections including the National Galleries of Scotland, the National Portrait Gallery, London, and the Royal Scottish Academy.

Life
Victoria Crowe was born in Kingston-on-Thames on 8 May 1945 and educated at Ursuline Convent Grammar School, London. She studied at Kingston College of Art from 1961-5, before undertaking further study at the Royal College of Art in London from 1965 to 1968. On the strength of her postgraduate exhibition, she was invited to teach at Edinburgh College of Art by Robin Philipson, Head of Drawing and Painting. She worked at ECA for the next thirty years as a part-time lecturer in Drawing and Painting, while also developing her own artistic practice.

She and her husband Michael Walton settled at Kittleyknowe near Carlops in the Pentland Hills, Scotland, where they befriended the shepherdess Jenny Armstrong. In 1973 she had a son and in 1976 a daughter. Her son died in 1995. They set up a trust in his name to raise awareness and funds to tackle oral cancers in young people. 

Over the last 35 years Victoria Crowe, one of Scotland’s leading painters, has established herself as a painter whose work is instantly recognisable. While the full range of her painting covers landscape, still lifes, portraits, self-portraits and interiors, much of her work defies such precise categorisation.

She has been described as ‘one of the most vital and original figurative painters currently at work in Scotland’.

Work
She began painting formal portraits in the early 1980s.  She has produced many individual portraits, including RD Laing, Kathleen Raine, Tam Dalyell, and Peter Higgs.

Her work includes the series A Shepherd's Life, painted between 1970 and 1985 and first shown at the Scottish National Portrait Gallery in Edinburgh in 2000, which portrays the life of Jenny Armstrong, an elderly shepherd from the Scottish Borders who was Crowe's neighbour at Kittleyknowe. One of the works in the series, Two Views, was converted into a tapestry by Dovecot Studios in Edinburgh, commissioned by Richard Scott, 10th Duke of Buccleuch.

Her first solo exhibition was held in 1983 at the Thackeray Gallery, London, where she would continue to exhibit regularly until 2007.

Between 1970 and 1985, Crowe undertook study trips to Russia, Denmark and Finland. She visited Italy in the early 1990s, which added the influence of Italian Renaissance art to her works, leading to a new phase of increased confidence and achievement. However, in 1994 her art was forced to respond to her son's diagnosis with cancer and then to his death in 1995, which resulted in a series of works expressing her grief, through repeated motifs such as the moon and flowers. Her works in the 21st century included wintry landscapes with skeletal hazel trees which Duncan Macmillan called "numinous pictures; they are spiritual landscapes".

In 2004 Crowe was appointed Senior Visiting Scholar at St Catherine's College, University of Cambridge. The work she produced during this period was shown at the exhibition Plant Memory at the Royal Scottish Academy, Edinburgh.

In 2013, the exhibition Fleece to Fibre, based on the making of the Large Tree Group tapestry, is shown during the Edinburgh International Festival at the Dovecot Studios, Edinburgh. It toured thereafter to the Australian Tapestry Workshop, Melbourne; Inverness; and London. Commissioned portrait of Peter Higgs for the Royal Society of Edinburgh. Awarded a prestigious tapestry commission by the Worshipful Company of Leathersellers for the livery company’s headquarters in the City of London. 

In 2015 she became artist-in-residence at The Royal Drawing School Artist Studios, Dumfries House and the following year was commissioned to create a portrait of Dame Jocelyn Bell Burnell for the Royal Society of Edinburgh.

In 2017 Crowe designed The Leathersellers' Tapestry for the Dining Hall of the Leathersellers' Building in London. The forty metre-long tapestry was woven at Dovecot Tapestry Studios in Edinburgh. In 2018,  she was awarded the Sir William Gillies Research Award by the Royal Scottish Academy supporting the making of a video projection responding to Schubert’s Winterreise song cycle. Winterreise: A Parallel Journey, a collaboration with opera singer Matthew Rose and pianist Gary Matthewman, is performed at the Britten Studio, Snape Maltings, and at the Wigmore Hall, London. 

In 2019, Victoria Crowe: Beyond Likeness was exhibited at the Scottish National Portrait Gallery and showcased over fifty portraits from the 1960s to the present. A commissioned portrait of HRH Prince Charles, the Duke of Rothesay was also unveiled there. Victoria Crowe: 50 Years of Painting was shown at the City Art Centre, Edinburgh. This major retrospective highlighted the artist’s career from student work tup until 2019. 

Victoria Crowe is represented by The Scottish Gallery, Edinburgh and Flowers Gallery, London.

Honours
2004: Officer of the Order of the British Empire (OBE)
2009: Awarded Doctor Honoris Causa (DHC), University of Aberdeen
2010: Fellow of the Royal Society of Edinburgh
Member of the Royal Scottish Academy

Selected exhibitions
1989: Bruton Gallery, Bath
1991: Thackeray Gallery, London
1993: Bruton Gallery, Bath
1993: Ancrum Gallery, Borders Festival
1994: Thackeray Gallery, London
2000: A Shepherd's Life, Scottish National Portrait Gallery
2007: Plant Memory, Royal Scottish Academy
2009: Fine Art Society, London
2013: Fleece to Fibre, Dovecot Studios, Edinburgh
2018: Victoria Crowe: Beyond Likeness, Scottish National Portrait Gallery
2019: Victoria Crowe: 50 Years of Painting, City Art Centre, Edinburgh

Collections
Crowe's work is held in a wide range of collections, including:
National Galleries of Scotland: Portraits including Callum Macdonald (1996), Graham Crowden (1996) and Winifred Rushforth (1982)
National Portrait Gallery, London: Portraits of Kathleen Raine (1986) and Dame Janet Vaughan (1986)
Royal Scottish Academy
National Trust for Scotland: Portrait of Lord Wemyss (1989)
St John's College, Oxford: Portrait of Professor Bill Hayes (1991)
National Museum of Scotland: Large Tree Group tapestry (2012), produced in collaboration with Dovecot Tapestry Studios, Edinburgh
Royal Society of Edinburgh: Portraits of Dame Jocelyn Bell Burnell (2016) and Professor Peter Higgs (2013)
St Catherine's College, Cambridge: Portrait of Professor David Ingram (2003)

Bibliography

Monographs
Crowe, Victoria and Walton, Michael, Victoria Crowe: Painted Insights, Antique Collectors Club, 2001
Macmillan, Duncan. Victoria Crowe. Antique Collectors' Club Ltd, 2012.
Mansfield, Susan, Macmillan, Duncan and Peploe, Guy. Victoria Crowe: 50 Years of Painting. Sansom & Co., 2019.

Further reading 

 Crowe, Victoria and Robertson, Naomi, Victoria Crowe: The Leathersellers' Tapestry, The Leathersellers' Company, 2017
 Taubman, Mary, Lawson, Julie and Crowe, Victoria, A Shepherd's Life: Paintings of Jenny Armstrong by Victoria Crowe, Scottish National Portrait Gallery, 2018
 Macmillan, Duncan and Crowe, Victoria, Victoria Crowe: Beyond Likeness, Scottish National Portrait Gallery, 2019
 Mansfield, Susan and Spence, Alan, Catching the Light, The Scottish Gallery, 2019

References

External links

Her website
Catalogue for Victoria Crowe. 50 Years: Drawing and Thinking exhibition at The Scottish Gallery, Edinburgh

1945 births
Living people
20th-century Scottish women artists
21st-century Scottish women artists
Alumni of the Royal College of Art
Fellows of the Royal Society of Edinburgh
Officers of the Order of the British Empire
People from Kingston upon Thames